Juanita Mok (born July 13 1995) is a taijiquan athlete from Hong Kong. She won silver medals in women's taijiquan at the 2018 Asian Games and in taijijian at the 2019 World Wushu Championships. She is also a double gold medalist at the World Junior Wushu Championships.

See also 

 List of Asian Games medalists in wushu

References

External links 

 Juanita Mok on Instagram

1995 births
Living people
Hong Kong wushu practitioners
Wushu practitioners at the 2018 Asian Games
Asian Games medalists in wushu
Asian Games silver medalists for Hong Kong
Medalists at the 2018 Asian Games
Medalists at the 2017 Summer Universiade